Year 1573 (MDLXXIII) was a common year starting on Thursday (link will display the full calendar) of the Julian calendar.

Events 

 January–June 
 January 25 – Battle of Mikatagahara in Japan: Takeda Shingen defeats Tokugawa Ieyasu.
 January 28
 Articles of the Warsaw Confederation are signed, sanctioning religious freedom in Poland.
 The Croatian–Slovene Peasant Revolt breaks out against the oppressive nobility; the revolt is quelled violently by February 15 and Matija Gubec, leader of the rebellion, publicly executed in Zagreb.
 February–March – The siege of Noda Castle takes place in Japan.
 March 7 – The Ottoman–Venetian War (1570–1573) is ended by a peace treaty, confirming the transfer of control of Cyprus from the Republic of Venice to the Ottoman Empire, and also confirming Turkish occupation of the more fertile region of Dalmatia.
 May 11–16 – The Duke of Anjou is elected to the throne of the Polish–Lithuanian Commonwealth by the Polish nobility. 
 May 26 – Battle of Haarlemmermeer: Geuzen ships, attempting to break the siege of Haarlem, are defeated by a combined Spanish and Amsterdam fleet.

 July–December 
 July 6 – Córdoba, in the Viceroyalty of Peru, is founded by Jerónimo Luis de Cabrera.
 July 12 – Siege of Haarlem: Spanish forces under the Duke of Alva capture Haarlem, after a seven-month siege.
 July – The Edict of Boulogne is signed by Charles IX of France, granting limited rights to Huguenots, and ending the Fourth War of Religion in France.
 August – Alva begins to besiege Alkmaar in North Holland.
 August 27 – Oda Nobunaga drives the 15th Ashikaga shōgun Ashikaga Yoshiaki out of Kyoto, effectively destroying the Ashikaga shogunate, and historically ending the Muromachi and Sengoku periods. The Azuchi–Momoyama period of Japan begins.
 September 8–16 – Siege of Hikida Castle and siege of Ichijōdani Castle in Japan: The Asakura clan is eliminated by Oda Nobunaga.
 September 22–26 – Siege of Odani Castle in Japan: The Azai clan is eliminated by Oda Nobunaga.
 October 8 – The Spanish abandon the siege of the city of Alkmaar. 
 October – The Spanish under John of Austria take Tunis
 November 15 – Santa Fe, Argentina, is founded by Juan de Garay.
 November – Alva resigns as Spanish Governor-General and Commander-in-Chief in the Netherlands, and is succeeded by Luis de Requesens, who attempts to pursue a more conciliatory policy.

 Date unknown 
 Sarsa Dengel, emperor of Ethiopia, defeats the Oromo in a battle near Lake Zway.
 The first Spanish galleon, laden with silver for the porcelain and silk trade with the Ming Dynasty of China, lands at Manila in the Philippines. This occasion marks the beginning of the Spanish silver trade to China, that will trump that of the Portuguese, the latter of whom acted as an intermediary between the silver mines of Japan, and the luxury items in China to be purchased with that silver. Most of the silver entering China comes from what is now Mexico, Bolivia, and Peru in the New World.
 The Luzhou Laojiao liquor is made. 
 The Portuguese are expelled from the Maldives.
 Queen Elizabeth's Grammar School for Boys, Barnet, England, is formed.

Births 

 January 1 – Philippus Rovenius, Dutch priest (d. 1651)
 January 10 – Simon Marius, German astronomer (d. 1624)
 January 18 – Ambrosius Bosschaert, still life painter of the Dutch Golden Age (d. 1621)
 January 20 – Alexander, Duke of Schleswig-Holstein-Sonderburg (d. 1627)
 January 22 – Ludwig Camerarius, German politician (d. 1651)
 January 30 – Georg Friedrich, Margrave of Baden-Durlach (1604–1622) (d. 1638)
 February 28 – Elias Holl, German architect (d. 1646)
 March 12 – Agnes Hedwig of Anhalt, Abbess of Gernrode, Electress of Saxony, Duchess of Schleswig-Holstein-Sønderborg-Plön (d. 1616)
 March 24 – Giovanni Doria, Spanish noble (d. 1642)
 April 6 – Margaret of Brunswick-Lüneburg, German noble (d. 1643)
 April 12 – Jacques Bonfrère, Flemish Jesuit priest, biblical scholar (d. 1642)
 April 13 – Christina of Holstein-Gottorp, Queen of Sweden (d. 1625)
 April 17 – Maximilian I, Elector of Bavaria (d. 1651)
 April 28 – Charles de Valois, Duke of Angoulême, natural son of Charles IX of France (d. 1650)
 May 12 – Henri, Duke of Montpensier, French noble (d. 1608)
 May 13 – Taj Bibi Bilqis Makani, Mughal empress (d. 1619)
 June 12 – Robert Radclyffe, 5th Earl of Sussex, British Earl (d. 1629)
 June 16 – Andries de Witt, Grand Pensionary of Holland (d. 1637)
 June 28 – Henry Danvers, 1st Earl of Danby, English noble (d. 1643)
 July 12 – Pietro Carrera, Italian priest, painter and saint (d. 1647)
 July 14 – Bonaventure Hepburn, Scottish philologist and Minim friar (d. 1620)
 July 15 – Inigo Jones, English architect (d. 1652)
 July 18 – Odoardo Fialetti, Italian painter (d. 1638)
 July 25 – Christoph Scheiner, German astronomer and Jesuit (d. 1650)
 July 29 – Philip II, Duke of Pomerania-Stettin (d. 1618)
 August 16 – Anne of Austria, Queen of Poland (d. 1598)
 August 25 – Elizabeth of Denmark, Duchess of Brunswick-Wolfenbüttel, German regent (d. 1626)
 September 8 – Georg Friedrich von Greiffenklau, Archbishop of Mainz (d. 1629)
 September 28 – Théodore de Mayerne, Swiss physician (d. 1654)
 September 29 – Robert Payne, English politician (d. 1631)
 October 6 – Henry Wriothesley, 3rd Earl of Southampton (d. 1624)
 October 7 – William Laud, Archbishop of Canterbury (d. 1645)
 October 11 – Jacobus Boonen, Dutch Catholic archbishop (d. 1655)
 November 3 – Catherine of Lorraine, Abbess of Remiremont (d. 1648)
 November 29 – Johannes Canuti Lenaeus, archbishop of Uppsala (d. 1669)
 November 30 – Aubert Miraeus, Belgian historian (d. 1640)
 December 6 – Odoardo Farnese, Italian Catholic cardinal  (d. 1626)
 December 21 – Mathurin Régnier, French satirist (d. 1613)
 December 22 – Ernest Casimir I, Count of Nassau-Dietz (1606–1632) and Stadtholder of Groningen, Friesland and Drenthe (1625–1632) (d. 1632)
 December 23 – Giovanni Battista Crespi, Italian painter (d. 1632)
 date unknown
 Gabrielle d'Estrées, French royal mistress (d. 1599)
 Ukita Hideie, Japanese daimyō (d. 1655)
 Richard Johnson, English romance writer (d. 1659)
 Johannes Junius, Burgomeister of Bamberg (d. 1628)
 John Kendrick, English merchant (d. 1624)
 Oeyo, wife of Tokugawa Hidetada (d. 1626)
 Sigismund Báthory, Prince of Transylvania and of the Holy Roman Empire (d. 1613)
 approximate year
 June – Joan Pau Pujol, Catalan composer and organist (d. 1626)

Deaths 

 January 1
 Hans Boije af Gennäs, Swedish commander 
 Johann Pfeffinger, German theologian (b. 1493)
 January 12 –  William Howard, 1st Baron Howard of Effingham, English Lord High Admiral (b. 1510)
 February 7 – Hedwig Jagiellon, Electress of Brandenburg (b. 1513)
 March 2 – Johann Wilhelm, Duke of Saxe-Weimar (b. 1530)
 March 3 – Claude, Duke of Aumale, third son of Claude, Duke of Guise (b. 1526)
 March 13 – Michel de l'Hôpital, French statesman (b. 1505)
 April 2 – Otto Truchsess von Waldburg, German Catholic cardinal (b. 1514)
 April 7 – Andreas Masius, Flemish Catholic priest (b. 1514)
 April 29 – Guillaume Le Testu, French privateer (b. 1509)
 May 13 – Takeda Shingen, Japanese warlord (b. 1521)
 May 14 (bur.) – Richard Grafton, English merchant and printer (b. c.1506/7)
 June 15 – Antun Vrančić, Croatian archbishop (b. 1504)
 July – Étienne Jodelle, French dramatist and poet (b. 1532)
 July 7 – Giacomo Barozzi da Vignola, Italian architect (b. 1507)
 July 16 – Wigbolt Ripperda, mayor of Haarlem, Netherlands
 July 29 
 John Caius, English physician (b. 1510)
 Ruy Gómez de Silva, Portuguese noble (b. 1516)
 August 14 – Saitō Tatsuoki, Japanese warlord (b. 1548)
 September 7 – Joanna of Austria, Princess of Portugal (b. 1535)
 September 16 – Asakura Yoshikage, Japanese warlord (b. 1533)
 September 23 – Azai Hisamasa, Japanese warlord (b. 1526)
 September 26 – Azai Nagamasa, Japanese warlord (b. 1545)
 October 27 – Laurentius Petri, first Lutheran Archbishop of Sweden (b. 1499)
 November 9 – Shimazu Katsuhisa, Japanese nobleman (b. 1503)
 November 17 – Juan Ginés de Sepúlveda, Spanish philosopher and theologian (b. 1494)
 December 30 – Giovanni Battista Giraldi, Italian novelist and poet (b. 1504)
 date unknown
 Paul Skalich, Croatian encyclopedist (b. 1534)
 Reginald Wolfe, English printer
 Maria van Schooten, Dutch war heroine (b. 1555)
 Murakami Yoshikiyo, Japanese warlord (b. 1501)

References